International Accounting Bulletin is a monthly accountancy trade magazine that covers the global accounting business. It is also known under the acronym IAB.

History
International Accounting Bulletin was first launched in 1983 as a newsletter by Michael Lafferty of the UK publisher Lafferty Group.

In 2004 the newsletter was sold to UK media company VRL Knowledgebank in a deal that also included sister publication The Accountant.

In 2012 VRL Financial News was bought by Progressive Digital Media.

Today, the magazine is produced by an editorial team of four people in London, with correspondents in Singapore, India, Canada, Mexico and Brussels.

Coverage
Targeted at accounting firms, networks and associations, IAB provides data, news and analysis on mergers and acquisitions, leadership changes, network additions, strategy, financial results, lawsuits, regulation and compliance issues. International Accounting Bulletin is read by C-Level executives, in particular accounting firm leaders and strategists.

Research
Each month the International Accounting Bulletin publishes Country Surveys on accounting firms. These surveys feature in-depth analysis of the leading firms, networks and associations with data on fee income, business line fee split, staff data and contact information.
At the beginning of each year, the International Accounting Bulletin launches a World Survey that ranks the leading 40 accounting networks and associations.

2013 surveys
Country: United States, Canada, China, Spain, Poland, Italy, Turkey, Netherlands, Germany, France, South Korea, Mexico, India, Australia, Russia, South Africa, Brazil, Japan, United Kingdom, Africa, Latin America, World

Events
Each year the International Accounting Bulletin hosts an event to launch its annual World Survey, which was attended by industry leaders from various accounting firms, including Grant Thornton, INPACT, Morison International, RSM International, PwC, KPMG, EY, HLB International, BKR International, Deloitte and BDO.

References

External links

Accounting magazines
Business magazines published in the United Kingdom
Magazines established in 1983
Magazines published in London
Monthly magazines published in the United Kingdom